Chakhimakhi (Dargwa: Чяхимахьи) is a rural locality (a selo) in Ayalakabsky Selsoviet, Levashinsky District, Republic of Dagestan, Russia. The population was 186 as of 2010. There are 2 streets.

Geography 
Chakhimakhi is located 28 km west of Levashi (the district's administrative centre) by road, on the Kakaozen River. Degva and Vanashimakhi are the nearest rural localities.

Nationalities 
Dargins live there.

References 

Rural localities in Levashinsky District